Kamen-Mukdykyn is a small uninhabited island in the Sea of Okhotsk, in the Russian Far East.

Geography
Kamen-Mukdykyn lies in Odyan Bay. It is 280 m south of the mainland.

Administratively Kamen-Mukdykyn is within the Magadan Oblast, in the Russian Federation.

See also
Islands of the Sea of Okhotsk
Islands of the Russian Far East

References

Islands of the Sea of Okhotsk
Islands of the Russian Far East
Islands of Magadan Oblast
Uninhabited islands of Russia
Uninhabited islands of the Pacific Ocean